Soft Bloom is the eighth studio album by Azalia Snail, released on June 29, 1999 by Dark Beloved Cloud.

Track listing

Personnel 
Adapted from Soft Bloom liner notes.
 Azalia Snail – vocals, instruments, production

Release history

References

External links 
 Soft Bloom at Discogs (list of releases)
 Soft Bloom at Bandcamp

1999 albums
Azalia Snail albums